Castle Sinister was a 1932 British horror film produced, written and directed by Widgey R. Newman.  Very little is known of either the film or the director, although available information suggests Newman to have been something of a maverick in the British film industry of the time. Castle Sinister is classed as a lost film.

Overview
The film was apparently set in a lonely mansion in Devon, and was marketed with the tagline "Mad doctor tries to put girl's brain into apeman's head!"

A brief synopsis in the cinema magazine The Bioscope (6 April 1932) offers a plot outline:  "The story of a young man's adventures in a large country mansion with a scientist who is engaged in forwarding his theory that rejuvenation by the transfer of certain glands is more than a possibility. A girl is, of course, involved to supply the necessary love interest, and a misshapen creature, victim of the scientist, supplies the thrills."  It also mentions "a constantly howling wind and a generous sprinkling of skulls and skeletons".

Cast
 Haddon Mason as Roland Kemp
 Eric Adeney as Professor Bandov
 Wally Patch as Jorkins
 Ilsa Kilpatrick as Jean
 Edmund Kennedy as Father

Survival status

Castle Sinister is now considered lost with nothing known to survive even in the way of production stills or promotional material.  The film is considered of great interest by horror film historians as one of the first documented British horror films and a very early experiment in a genre for which the British film industry would become renowned between the 1950s and 1970s.  Although the likelihood of the film being rediscovered would appear remote, in view of its perceived historical value it is included on the British Film Institute's "75 Most Wanted" list of missing British feature films.

References

External links 
 BFI 75 Most Wanted entry, with extensive notes
 

1932 films
1932 horror films
British horror films
British black-and-white films
Lost British films
Lost horror films
Films directed by Widgey R. Newman
Quota quickies
1930s English-language films
1930s British films